Stadionul Comunal is a multi-use stadium in Tărlungeni, Romania. It is used mostly for football matches and is the home ground of Liga IV clubs Ciucaș Tărlungeni and Colțea Brașov. It was the home ground of Unirea Tărlungeni between 1983 and 2016. The stadium holds 1,000 people.

References

Football venues in Romania
Buildings and structures in Brașov County